The 2011–12 Bangladesh Federation Cup was the 24th edition to be played and was won by Sheikh Jamal Dhanmondi Club for the first time, defeating Team BJMC 3:1 in the final.

The competition started on 23 December with a qualification stage and finished with the final at the Bangabandhu National Stadium on 24 January.

18 teams took part with a qualification for sides outside the top flight, 6 winners of the one-legged ties would enter the first round being played as a Group Stage, with four groups of four teams. The top two teams from each group qualified for the Quarter Final Stage.

Group stage

Group A

Group B

Group C

Group D

Quarter finals

Semi finals

Final

2011
2011 in Bangladeshi football
2012 in Bangladeshi football